Wounded is the second full-length studio album by the American progressive rock band Enchant, released in 1996  in Europe on Inside Out Music and 1997 in the US on Magna Carta Records.

Track listing
"Below Zero" (Ott) – 6:07
"Fade 2 Grey" (Craddick, Ott) – 8:10
"Pure" (Craddick, Ott) – 7:17
"Broken" (Craddick, Leonard, Ott) – 7:44
"Hostile World" (Craddick, Geimer, Leonard, Ott, Platt) – 6:29
"Look Away" (Craddick, Geimer, Ott) – 6:40
"Armour" (Craddick, Ott) – 6:57
"Distractions" (Craddick, Leonard, Ott) – 7:27
"Missing" (Ott) – 6:36

Personnel
Enchant
 Ted Leonard – vocals
 Douglas A. Ott – guitars, additional keyboards
 Mike "Benignus" Geimer – keyboards
 Ed Platt – bass
 Paul Craddick – drums; additional keyboards (track 4)

Additional musicians
 Phil Bennett — keyboards (tracks 1, 9)

Production
 Douglas A. Ott – engineering, mixing
 Rick Geimer – artwork
 Ken Lee – mastering

References

1996 albums
Enchant (band) albums